Carinthian Matadors Rugby Football Club were a rugby union club in the Österreichischer Rugby Verband.

The club was founded by Mike Wagner and Volker Mannheim in 2003. The Matadors played their first friendly, a 15-a-side against Rugby Club Innsbruck, with help from the clubs in Graz and Linz. Paternion was also the venue for a preparation game between the Austrian national team and Udine Rugby Football Club.

The Matadors take part in the Austrian Challenge Cup since 2004. Steadily improving their game, they have managed so far to win three games. Top scorers are Jürgen Friedrich, Mathias Genser, Roland Gfrerer, Mike Wagner (in alphabetical order). The main handicap in the further development of the club is the low number of active players, currently about a dozen; a problem that will hopefully be addressed by raising increased awareness for the game.

The club hosted the match between Austria and Estonia of the Central Europe Development Tri-nations rugby league competition on 2 September 2006. This was the first ever Rugby league game in Austria. Matadors's Mathias "Mote" Genser won the man of the match award for Austria.

The inaugural Carinthian Sevens took place on 9 September 2006, the "ållarerstes internationales Paternioner Kirchtågsturnier" in Carinthian German.

Teams from as far afield as Moldova (RC UTM being the eventual winners), Slovenia and Germany participated. The success, especially due to the traditional and not so traditional entertainment available after the rugger - the event was held in conjunction with the local fair - encourages the Matadors to repeat the event next year on the second weekend of September, open to all interested teams and clubs.

The season 2008/09 marks a big step in the development of the club. Together with another club based in Carinthia, the Carinthian Bulldogs, founded early in 2008, the Matadors have been invited by the Austrian Rugby Union to participate - as Team Carinthia - in the forthcoming Second National Division.

External links
Carinthian Matadors RFC Official Website
Austrian Rugby Union Official Website
Austrian Challenge Cup
Central Europe Development Tri-nations Official Website

Austrian rugby union teams